Cross-country skiing at the 2011 Winter Universiade will be held at the Dumlu District in Erzurum, Turkey. The eleven events are scheduled for January 28 - February 5, 2011.

Men's events

Women's events

Mixed Event

Medal table

References

2011 in cross-country skiing
Cross-country skiing
Skiing competitions in Turkey
2011